Hasanabad (also Romanized as Ḩasanābād) is a village in Qaflankuh-e Sharqi Rural District, Kaghazkonan District, Meyaneh County, East Azerbaijan Province, Iran. At the 2006 census, its population was 79, in 21 families.

References 

Populated places in Meyaneh County